Jordi Gordillo Brunet (born 16 August 1983 in Barcelona) is a S5 classified  swimmer from Spain. He has cerebral palsy. He competed at the 2000 Summer Paralympics in Sydney, Australia. He competed at the 2004 Summer Paralympics in Athens, Greece, winning a bronze medal in the 4 x 50 meter 20 point medley relay. He competed at the 2008 Summer Paralympics in Beijing, China, winning a silver medal in the 4 x 50 meter 20 point medley relay.

From the Catalan region of Spain, he was a recipient of a 2012 Plan ADO scholarship.

References

External links 
 
 

1983 births
Living people
Swimmers from Barcelona
Spanish male freestyle swimmers
Paralympic swimmers of Spain
Paralympic gold medalists for Spain
Paralympic silver medalists for Spain
Paralympic bronze medalists for Spain
Paralympic medalists in swimming
Swimmers at the 2000 Summer Paralympics
Swimmers at the 2004 Summer Paralympics
Swimmers at the 2008 Summer Paralympics
Medalists at the 2000 Summer Paralympics
Medalists at the 2004 Summer Paralympics
Medalists at the 2008 Summer Paralympics
Medalists at the World Para Swimming Championships
Plan ADOP alumni
S5-classified Paralympic swimmers